Sohanlal Pathak (7 January 1883 — 10 February 1916) was an Indian revolutionary from Punjab, and a member of Ghadar Party. Remembered for his martyrdom and for his propagation of the ideals of the Indian nationalism in Burma.

In August 1915, he was arrested while organizing a rebellion in Burma. He was put on trial for conspiracy and treason against the government and sentenced to death. He was hanged on 10 February 1916 at Mandalay Jail in Burma.

References 

{{DEFAULTSORT:
Pathak, Sohanlai}}
Indian nationalists
Indian revolutionaries
Hindu–German Conspiracy
 
Executed Indian people
Revolutionary movement for Indian independence
People executed by British India by hanging

Indian independence activists from Punjab, India